Hanna Maaret Halmeenpää (born 7 March 1976) is a Finnish politician, representing the Green League in the Parliament of Finland since 2015. She was elected to the Parliament from the Oulu constituency in 2015 with 4,860 votes.

Halmenpää has also served in the City Council of Kalajoki since 2008. In 2012 municipal elections she got the most votes in the city.

References

External links
 Home page of Hanna Halmeenpää

1976 births
Living people
Green League politicians
Members of the Parliament of Finland (2015–19)
People from Oulu